Prince Kwabena Adu (born 23 September 2003) is a Ghanaian footballer who plays for Isloch Minsk Raion. He was included in The Guardian's "Next Generation 2020".

Career statistics

Club

References

External links
 

2003 births
Living people
Ghanaian footballers
Ghana youth international footballers
Association football forwards
Ghanaian expatriate footballers
Expatriate footballers in Belarus
Ghana Premier League players
Bechem United F.C. players
FC Isloch Minsk Raion players